Dirceu Marinho (born 23 November 1970) is a Brazilian rower. He competed in the men's double sculls event at the 1996 Summer Olympics.

References

External links
 

1970 births
Living people
Brazilian male rowers
Olympic rowers of Brazil
Rowers at the 1996 Summer Olympics
Rowers from Rio de Janeiro (city)
Rowers at the 1995 Pan American Games
Pan American Games silver medalists for Brazil
Medalists at the 1995 Pan American Games
Pan American Games medalists in rowing